Samuel W. Frazier (born 1851, Georgia) was a farmer, justice of the peace and state legislator in Florida. He was elected to several terms in the Florida House of Representatives from Leon County.

He was the justice of the peace for Lean County from 1872 to 1873. Then served in the Florida House in 1879, 1885 and 1887.

In 1879 he served Leon County with William H. Ford, John E. Proctor and Samuel Walker.

In 1885 he served Leon County with Clinton Sneed (or Snead), David S. Walker, Jr. (son of David S. Walker) and Edmund C. Weeks.

In 1887 he served Leon County with Wallace B. Carr, John W. Mitchell and Clinton Sneed.

See also
African-American officeholders during and following the Reconstruction era

References

1851 births
Year of death missing
Date of death unknown
Members of the Florida House of Representatives
African-American state legislators in Florida
People from Georgia (U.S. state)